List of Hospitals in Idaho — in the Northwestern United States.

Hospitals

References

Hospitals
Idaho